Corryville is a neighborhood in Cincinnati, Ohio, east of the University of Cincinnati, southeast of Clifton, south and west of Avondale, northwest of Walnut Hills, and north of Mount Auburn. The population was 4,373 at the 2020 census.

Demographics

Source - City of Cincinnati Statistical Database

History
The original owners of part of the land were Jacob Burnet and William McMillan. The neighborhood's namesake, William Corry, was an early mayor of Cincinnati and himself a prominent landowner in the Corryville area. German Americans largely settled the village of Corryville, moving north up the hillside from the congested Over-the-Rhine basin. Corryville was annexed to the City of Cincinnati in 1870.

Corryville is well known for Short Vine Street, which contains several small shops, restaurants, bars, and the music venue Bogart's. Mecklenburg's Garden, a German restaurant founded in the 1800s, is listed on the National Register of Historic Places; it has operated since at least 1870. Short Vine was also home to Sudsy Malone's Rock 'n Roll Laundry & Bar and other small music venues catering to the punk and alternative rock crowd during the 1980s and 1990s.

Over the past several years, Corryville has continued to shift its demographics, economics, and appearance. Many new homes, apartment buildings, condominiums, and shops and restaurants have been constructed. The neighborhood has increasingly shifted to younger residents who are affiliated with the University of Cincinnati, Cincinnati Children's Hospital, and University Hospital.  

Consequently, property values in the area have increased year-over-year since 2005, causing renewed interest in economic investment in the area while furthering the demographic shift of the area. According to Realtor.com, the average home price in Corryville is $232,812 compared with $174,900 for Cincinnati. Additionally, the average cost per square foot is $176 compared with $71 for Cincinnati.

See also
 Pill Hill, Cincinnati

References

Neighborhoods in Cincinnati